Sombrero Lighthouse is a lighthouse that marks the Anegada Passage, which is the route from Europe into the Caribbean.

History
The first lighthouse, built by the American company that extracted the phosphate on the island, came into operation 1 January 1868. It consisted of a circular pyramidal skeletal tower, on concrete base, with balcony and lantern; by 1893 it was managed by the British Board of Trade. In 1931, the old light system was changed and improved to 200,000 candle power and the tower received its first major repair when the basement was encased in concrete.

In 1960 Hurricane Donna damaged the lighthouse; a new one replaced it 20 July 1962. The lighthouses were manned from 1868 to 2001.

In 2001 Trinity House donated and installed the current automated tower, which is a  cylindrical tower painted white with balcony and no lantern. Since 1 December 2001 Anguilla's Department of Fisheries and Marine Resources has been responsible for the maintenance of the navigational aids.

See also
 List of lighthouses in Anguilla
 Sombrero, Anguilla

References

External links
 Sombrero cultural heritage

Lighthouses in Anguilla
Lighthouses completed in 1868